William Hendriksen (18 November 1900 – 12 January 1982) was a New Testament scholar and writer of Bible commentaries. He was born in Tiel, Gelderland, but his family moved to Kalamazoo, Michigan in 1911. Hendriksen studied at Calvin College and Calvin Theological Seminary before obtaining an S.T.D. degree from Pikes Peak Bible Seminary, as was common for on-the-job pastors seeking doctorates in the 1930s and 1940s. It is there that he wrote the thesis More than Conquerors. This book has never gone off the market since it was then privately printed and Herman Baker issued it as the first publication of the new Baker Book House in 1940. He received a Th.D. from Princeton Theological Seminary.

Hendriksen was an ordained minister in the Christian Reformed Church and served as Professor of New Testament at Calvin Theological Seminary from 1942 to 1952. He started the New Testament Commentary, completing commentaries on more than half of the New Testament books. This series was published by Baker and completed by Simon Kistemaker after Hendriksen's death. Hendriksen was awarded a posthumous Gold Medallion Book Award for his commentary on Romans. He also translated the Book of Revelation for the New International Version. His granddaughter Dawn Wolthuis now serves as President of the Institute for Christian Studies.

In his influential work Israel and Prophecy, written a year after the 1967 war, and still in print, Hendriksen criticized the view, held by dispensationalists and Christian Zionists, that the Bible prophesies the return and restoration of the Jews to the land of Israel. Dispensationalist pastor Barry Horner  describes Hendriksen's work as "a classic representation of replacement theology".

Hendriksen has been described as "one of the leading and most respected of New Testament commentators."

New Testament Commentaries

 New Testament Commentary: Matthew
 New Testament Commentary: Mark
 New Testament Commentary: Luke
 New Testament Commentary: John
 New Testament Commentary: Romans
 New Testament Commentary: Galatians and Ephesians
 New Testament Commentary: Philippians, Colossians, and Philemon
 New Testament Commentary: 1 & 2 Thessalonians, 1 & 2 Timothy, and Titus

References

1900 births
1982 deaths
American Calvinist and Reformed theologians
Christian Reformed Church ministers
Bible commentators
Calvin University alumni
Dutch emigrants to the United States
New Testament scholars
People from Kalamazoo, Michigan
People from Tiel
Princeton Theological Seminary alumni
20th-century Calvinist and Reformed theologians
20th-century American non-fiction writers
20th-century American clergy